Francis Prout (7 July 1921 Greenwich, Greater London, England – 23 February 2011 Woodbridge, Suffolk, England) was a British sprint canoer who competed in the early 1950s. He was eliminated in the heats of the K-2 1000 m event at the 1952 Summer Olympics in Helsinki.

Francis moved to Canvey Island as an infant with his parents, Margueritte, a native of Switzerland, and Geoffrey Prout, a writer and boat builder. During World War II Prout served as airframe fitter with the RAF in southwest Asia and then went to Rhodesia where he became a flying instructor. After the War, he married Erica Hawks and had two children, Jane and Stephen. Together with his brother Roland Prout, in the family firm of G. Prout & Sons (founded in 1935 by their father, Geoffrey Prout), he developed the pioneering Shearwater III racing catamaran in 1956 and several later designs. He set a Guinness record for having the most title wins in a year.

References

External links

1921 births
2011 deaths
English male canoeists
Canoeists at the 1952 Summer Olympics
Olympic canoeists of Great Britain
People from Greenwich
British male canoeists
British yacht designers
Royal Air Force personnel of World War II
British expatriates in Rhodesia